St Andrew's Church, Cherry Hinton is a Church of England parish church in Cherry Hinton, Cambridge. It is Grade I listed. The building dates from the late 12th century with a 13th-century chancel. It was constructed using locally available flint, clunch and Barnack stone (oolitic Lincolnshire limestone).

History
Simon Langham when Bishop of Ely (1362–1366) was a major benefactor of Peterhouse, Cambridge and gave the rectory of Cherry Hinton to the college.

The church was restored and rebuilt by George Gilbert Scott Jr. in 1880. The chancel was restored in 1886 by John Thomas Micklethwaite.

A daughter church, St John the Evangelist's, was founded in 1891 to serve the developing residential area between Hills Road and Cherry Hinton Road.

Architecture

The ashlar-faced chancel with its pairs of lancet windows (c.1230-50.) is a fine example of Early English Gothic architecture. The east window was replaced in the early Tudor period by a five-light version in the perpendicular style. The ashlar-faced tower is also in the perpendicular style though there are remnants of Norman origin in the arches. Within the tower the second bell dates from the 14th century and is the oldest in the city.

In the tower is the coffin-shaped tablet of Captain Serocold (d.1794) by John Flaxman.

References

Church of England church buildings in Cambridge
13th-century church buildings in England
Grade I listed buildings in Cambridge
Grade I listed churches in Cambridgeshire